This article contains information about the literary events and publications of 1824.

Events
January – The British periodicals The Children's Friend and The Child's Companion both publish their first issues.
January 24 – The first issue of a radical quarterly founded by Jeremy Bentham, The Westminster Review, is published in London.
February 9 – Because of dire family financial straits, Charles Dickens, just turned 12, begins work in a blacking factory in London. On February 23 his father, John Dickens, is committed to the Marshalsea prison as a debtor.
February 15 – Lord Byron falls ill at Missolonghi while taking part in the Greek War of Independence. He dies of fever on April 19.
April – The United States Literary Gazette, a semi-monthly, begins publication. It publishes poetry by Henry Wadsworth Longfellow and William Cullen Bryant, among many others.
May — "Sketches of the Five American Presidents, and of the Five Presidential Candidates, From the Memoranda of a Traveler," by John Neal, the first work by an American author published in a British literary journal.
May 7 – The première of Beethoven's Symphony No. 9 (the "Choral") is played at the Theater am Kärntnertor in Vienna. It incorporates a setting of Schiller's "Ode to Joy" (Ode an die Freude, 1785).
May 17 – The publisher John Murray and with five of Lord Byron's friends and executors, decide to destroy the manuscript of Byron's memoirs (which he has been given to publish), because of scandalous details that would damage Byron's reputation. Opposed only by Thomas Moore, the two volumes of memoirs are dismembered and burnt in the fireplace at the John Murray (publisher)'s office, 50 Albemarle Street in London.
June 21 – The Vagrancy Act in England provides for the prosecution of "every Person wilfully exposing to view, in any Street... or public Place, any obscene Print, Picture, or other indecent Exhibition".
unknown date – Julia Catherine Beckwith's St. Ursula's Convent or, The Nun of Canada; Containing Scenes from Real Life becomes the first novel published in Canada by a native-born Canadian (anonymously).

New books

Fiction
William Cardell – The Story of Jack Halyard, the Sailor Boy
Mary Charlton – The Homicide
Lydia Maria Child – Hobomok
James Fenimore Cooper (anonymously) – The Pilot: A Tale of the Sea (published January, dated 1823)
Susan Ferrier – The Inheritance
Catherine Gore – Theresa Marchment, or The Maid of Honour
James Hogg (anonymously) – The Private Memoirs and Confessions of a Justified Sinner
Washington Irving (as Geoffrey Crayon, Gent.) – Tales of a Traveller
Charles Maturin – The Albigenses
Mary Russell Mitford – Our Village
James Justinian Morier – Hajji Baba of Ispahan
Regina Marie Roche – The Tradition of the Castle
Susanna Rowson – Charlotte's Daughter
Sir Walter Scott (anonymously) – Redgauntlet
Catharine Maria Sedgwick – Redwood
Louisa Stanhope – The Siege of Kenilworth

Children
William Cardell – The Story of Jack Halyard, the Sailor Boy
Agnes Strickland
The Aviary; Or, An Agreeable Visit. Intended for Children
The Use of Sight: Or, I Wish I Were Julia
The Little Tradesman, or, A Peep into English Industry

Drama
 Martin Archer Shee – Alasco
Manuel Bretón de los Herreros – Á la vejez viruelas (In Old Age, Chickenpox)

Poetry
Thomas Campbell – Theodric; a domestic tale; and other poems
Letitia Elizabeth Landon – The Improvisatrice, and Other Poems
Giacomo Leopardi – Canzoni and Versi
Alexander Pushkin - The Fountain of Bakhchisaray 
Alfred de Vigny – Éloa, ou La sœur des anges

Non-fiction
Louisa Gurney Hoare – Friendly Advice on the Management and Education of Children, Addressed to Parents of the Middle and Labouring Classes of Society

Births
January 7 – Julia Kavanagh, Irish novelist (died 1877)
January 8 – Wilkie Collins, English mystery novelist (died 1889)
January 15 – Anna Mary Howitt, English writer, painter and feminist (died 1884)
January 26 – Katharine Sarah Macquoid, English novelist and travel writer (died 1917)
March 5 – Lucy Larcom, American author, teacher, and poet (died 1893)
March 19 – George Murray Smith, English publisher, founder of the Dictionary of National Biography (died 1901)
April 27 – Edward Bruce Hamley, English military writer, general and politician (died 1893)
May 19 – William Allingham, Irish poet (died 1889)
June 20 – Rowena Granice Steele, American journalist, author, editor, publisher, and performer (died 1901)
July 11 – Mary Charlotte Ward Granniss Webster Billings, American writer, activist, hymn writer, evangelist, and missionary (died 1904)
July 27 – Alexandre Dumas, fils, French novelist (died 1895)
August 21 — Caroline Dana Howe, American poet, hymnwriter, and author (died 1907)
September 15 – A. D. T. Whitney, American poet and girls' writer (died 1906)
October 18 – Juan Valera y Alcalá-Galiano, Spanish realist novelist (died 1905)
November 8 – Annie Chambers Ketchum (religious name, Sister Amabilis), American author, educator, and lecturer (died 1904)
December 10 – George MacDonald, Scottish author, poet and Christian minister (died 1905)

Deaths
January 28 – John Larpent, English theatre censor (born 1741)
March 2 – Susanna Rowson, American novelist, poet and playwright (born 1762)
April 13 – Jane Taylor, English poet and novelist (born 1783)
April 19 – Lord Byron, English Romantic poet (born 1788)
September 23 – John Cartwright, English political reformer (born 1740)
October 30 – Charles Maturin, Irish playwright, novelist and cleric (born 1782)
November 23 – Matthäus Casimir von Collin, Austrian poet and dramatist (born 1779)

Awards
March – Samuel Taylor Coleridge elected Fellow of the Royal Society of Literature
Chancellor's Gold Medal – Winthrop Mackworth Praed
Newdigate Prize – John Thomas Hope

References

 
Years of the 19th century in literature